Riverside is an unincorporated community in Canyon County, Idaho, United States.

References

Unincorporated communities in Canyon County, Idaho
Unincorporated communities in Idaho
Boise metropolitan area